Gałczewo is a village in Kuyavian-Pomeranian Voivodeship, Poland, located in the municipality of Golub-Dobrzyń, Golub-Dobrzyń County.

References 

Villages in Golub-Dobrzyń County